Nigel Timothy Godrich (born 28 February 1971) is an English record producer, recording engineer and musician. He is known for his work with the English rock band Radiohead, having produced all their studio albums since OK Computer (1997). He has also produced several projects by the Radiohead singer, Thom Yorke. He is a member of Atoms for Peace (with Yorke) and Ultraísta.

Early in his career, Godrich worked as the house engineer at RAK Studios, London, under the producer John Leckie. He met Radiohead while working at RAK on their second album, The Bends (1995). Radiohead hired him to produce their next album, OK Computer, which was a major success and brought him attention from major artists. He has since worked with acts including Beck, Air, Paul McCartney, U2, R.E.M., Pavement, Roger Waters and Arcade Fire. Godrich is the creator of the music webseries From the Basement.

Early years and education
Nigel Godrich was born in Westminster, London, the son of Victor Godrich, a BBC sound supervisor, and Brenda Godrich. He was fascinated by recording at an early age. As a child, after he asked for a machine to make records, his father bought him a cassette machine; Godrich used it to make recordings of his television, train sets and running water.

Godrich was educated at William Ellis School in North West London, where he shared classes with his friend and the future Zero 7 member Henry Binns. Godrich began playing guitar, inspired by Jimi Hendrix and Frank Zappa. He first visited a recording studio at the age of 16, when his band recorded a demo at Elephant Studios, Wapping, and spent time asking the engineer questions. He studied at the School of Audio Engineering (SAE), London.

Career 
After graduating from SAE, Godrich became a junior staff member at the Audio One studio complex, working as a tea boy. He did not enjoy his time there; according to Godrich, "With a beeper in my pocket, I'd wait next to the kettle, ready to deliver my hot beverages. I wasn't even allowed in the studios, but I [would] hang there thinking, 'OK, it's only the first rung, but at least I'm on the ladder.'"

After the closure of Audio One, in 1990 Godrich worked at RAK Studios, London, first as a messenger and later as a studio assistant. He would stay late at night, inviting musician friends to play there while he practised recording them. At RAK, he became a tape operator for the producer John Leckie, with whom he worked on albums by Ride and Denim. After four years, Godrich left RAK to become freelance and set up his own studio, Shabang, where he planned to create dance music. Six months later, he was hired to engineer and mix The Sound Of... McAlmont & Butler (1995), the debut album by McAlmont & Butler. Godrich said it was a "brilliant experience" and credited Bernard Butler with teaching him how to produce records.

Radiohead 

Godrich first worked with the rock band Radiohead when Leckie hired him at RAK to engineer their EP My Iron Lung (1994) and their second album, The Bends (1995). The band nicknamed him "Nihilist", approving of his efforts to take their sound in new directions. When Leckie left the studio to attend a social engagement, Radiohead and Godrich stayed to record B-sides; one song, "Black Star", was instead included on The Bends. In 1995, Godrich produced Radiohead's charity single "Lucky", plus the B-sides "Bishop's Robes" and "Talk Show Host", released on the 1996 single "Street Spirit (Fade Out)".

Radiohead invited Godrich to co-produce their third album, OK Computer (1997), which won Best Alternative Album at the 40th Grammy Awards and sold more than 4.5 million copies worldwide. Working in improvised studios without supervision, Godrich and the band learned as they went, and credited the open process with the record's success. In 2013, Godrich told the Guardian: "OK Computer was such a big thing for me because I was given power for the first time. Some of these incredibly intelligent and insightful people said 'do what you want' to me so I worked my arse off for them and together we did something that represents where we all were at the time. And it stuck for some reason. People got it, so that changed my life."

Godrich has produced every Radiohead studio album since, and won the Grammy Award for Best Engineered Non-Classical Album for their sixth album, Hail to the Thief (2003). He did not work with Radiohead on the initial sessions for their seventh album, In Rainbows (2007). According to the guitarist Ed O'Brien, Radiohead wanted to get out of "the comfort zone", and the bassist Colin Greenwood said Godrich was busy working with Charlotte Gainsbourg and Beck. However, Radiohead re-enlisted Godrich after their sessions with another producer, Spike Stent, proved fruitless.<ref name=":5">{{Cite magazine |last=Vozick-Levinson |first=Simon |date=27 April 2012 |title=The making of Radiohead's In Rainbows''' |url=https://www.rollingstone.com/music/music-news/the-making-of-radioheads-in-rainbows-187534/ |url-status=live |magazine=Rolling Stone |archive-url=https://web.archive.org/web/20190730031338/https://www.rollingstone.com/music/music-news/the-making-of-radioheads-in-rainbows-187534/ |archive-date=30 July 2019 |access-date=30 July 2019}}</ref>

Godrich's father died during the recording of Radiohead's ninth album, A Moon Shaped Pool (2016); Godrich wrote: "Making this album was a very intense experience for me. I lost my dad in the process. Hence a large piece of my soul lives here in a good way." Godrich provided sound design for Kid A Mnesia Exhibition (2021), an interactive experience created for the anniversary of Kid A and Amnesiac.

In 2006, CBC described Godrich's collaboration with Radiohead as "the most adventurous band-producer partnership in modern rock". He has been dubbed the band's "sixth member", an allusion to Beatles producer George Martin being called the "fifth Beatle". Godrich also plays Chieftain Mews, a long-running character who appears in Radiohead's promotional material.

 Side projects 

Godrich has produced most of the solo work by Radiohead singer Thom Yorke, including his albums The Eraser (2006), Tomorrow's Modern Boxes (2014) and Anima (2019). Yorke credits Godrich with helping edit his work, identifying which parts need improvement and which have potential. He gave the example of the Eraser song "Black Swan", which originally was "a six-minute load of crap, except for this one juicy bit, and [Godrich] goes past and goes, 'That bit. Fuck the rest.' Usually it's something like that."

Godrich said: "When we were in a room when it's with Radiohead ... I'm trying to manage a relationship between [Yorke] and the band and it's me butting heads with him and trying to work on behalf of the band. As soon as he and I were alone, we found that the dynamic was completely different, we were pulling in the same direction and it was incredibly productive."

In 2009, to perform songs from The Eraser, Godrich and Yorke formed Atoms for Peace, with Godrich on guitar, keyboards and synthesisers. The band also includes the bassist Flea of the Red Hot Chili Peppers, the drummer Joey Waronker of Beck and R.E.M., and the percussionist Mauro Refosco of Forro in the Dark. Their debut album, Amok, produced by Godrich, was released in 2013, followed by a tour of Europe, the US and Japan. Godrich engineered Junun (2015), an album by the Radiohead guitarist Jonny Greenwood, the Israeli composer Shye Ben Tzur and the Indian ensemble the Rajasthan Express, recorded at Mehrangarh Fort in Rajasthan, India.

Godrich produced A Light for Attracting Attention (2022), the debut album by the Smile, a band comprising Yorke, Greenwood and the drummer Tom Skinner. The Guardian critic Alexis Petridis said the Smile "sound like a simultaneously more skeletal and knottier version of Radiohead", exploring more progressive rock influences with unusual time signatures, complex riffs and "hard-driving" motorik psychedelia.

 Other projects 
Following his success with OK Computer, Godrich mixed most of Natalie Imbruglia's hit album Left of the Middle (1997) and R.E.M.'s Up (1998). Godrich has collaborated with American singer-songwriter Beck several times, on Mutations (1998), Sea Change (2002) and The Information (2006). The first two of these albums, particularly Sea Change, were noted for their atmospheric folk/pop sound, a departure from the spontaneous, sample-heavy style Beck was known for. Godrich has also worked with Travis, producing their commercial breakthrough The Man Who (1999) and its followup The Invisible Band (2001) and co-producing The Boy With No Name (2007) with Brian Eno and Mike Hedges.

Godrich produced Pavement's final album Terror Twilight (1999), with Radiohead's Jonny Greenwood contributing harmonica on two tracks. Godrich, a fan of the band, hoped to help them find a bigger audience with a less "sloppy" record. Songwriter Stephen Malkmus later described the album as "overproduced" and described conflicts with Godrich. In response, Godrich tweeted: "I literally slept on a friend's floor in NYC to be able to make that album." In 2020, Godrich said that he loved the album and had enjoyed making it.

In 2001, Godrich remixed U2's "Walk On" for its single release, and mixed and contributed production to Air's albums Talkie Walkie (2004) and Pocket Symphony (2007). In 2002, Godrich was hired to produce the second album by the Strokes, Room on Fire (2003). He was fired when their work, according to the band, proved "soulless". Godrich said of the failed collaboration: "The problem there was that me and [singer Julian Casablancas] are just too similar, we're both control freaks. He wanted to do it his way, I wanted to do it my way, and obviously that's the point of me being there. And I'm saying 'Well, why am I here if you're not prepared to try and do it the way I want to do it?' We got on great, it was just one of those laughable things where it just doesn't work. I wanted them to change, and they didn't."

Godrich produced the 20th anniversary version of "Do They Know It's Christmas?", released in December 2004, which featured Yorke and Greenwood. Paul McCartney hired Godrich to produce his album Chaos and Creation in the Backyard (2005) after being recommended by Beatles producer George Martin. Godrich fired McCartney's touring band and demanded that McCartney abandon songs Godrich found clichéd, over-sentimental, or subpar. The album was nominated for several Grammy Awards, including Album of the Year, and Godrich was nominated for Producer of the Year.

In 2010, Godrich and Beck composed the score for Scott Pilgrim vs. the World, Godrich's first film work. In October 2012, Godrich, along with Joey Waronker and singer Laura Bettinson, released an album as Ultraísta. In 2015, he produced the live album Roger Waters: The Wall, and made a cameo as a Stormtrooper in Star Wars: The Force Awakens. He mixed the Red Hot Chili Peppers' eleventh studio album, The Getaway (2016). Godrich produced the fifth solo album by Roger Waters, Is This the Life We Really Want?, released in June 2017. Godrich, a fan of Waters' work with Pink Floyd, was critical of Waters' previous solo work and felt his role as producer was to "encourage him, to push him a little bit". During the COVID-19 pandemic, Godrich worked with the Arcade Fire in isolation in El Paso, Texas, recording their album We (2022).

From the Basement (2006–2009)

In September 2006, it was announced that Godrich, along with producer Dilly Gent, producer James Chads and John Woollcombe, were shooting the music series From the Basement, filmed from London's Maida Vale Studios. The series focused on intimate, live performances by musicians without a host or an audience. Godrich said, "I'm really interested to capture some really iconic, bigger names– really the whole point is to get people who are having their moment, to try and get a definitive record of what they're doing."

Godrich conceived From the Basement as a means of authentically documenting music being made. Drawing further inspiration from British television music series The Old Grey Whistle Test, Godrich came upon the idea of a television programme. Despite early reports, From the Basement did not initially appear on British television, because of not taking on corporate sponsors.

When the pilot was in production, From the Basement was to be an online programme only. However, this was not feasible as it did not generate enough money to produce the episodes to the quality level desired. Instead, the producers went to international TV networks to receive money up front to produce the series. The series did eventually air on television; the first UK broadcast was on Sky Arts on 1 December 2007, featuring four songs performed by Thom Yorke on 8 December 2007. The United States premiere was on Rave HD on 22 February 2008, followed by a run on Independent Film Channel, as part of the network's "Automat" block of television programmes in the autumn of 2008. On 3 November 2008, the series was released on DVD. A new series of From the Basement'' began on YouTube in May 2022, featuring acts including Idles, Warpaint and Caribou.

Approach and influences 
Godrich credited the producers Phil Thornalley, John Leckie and Steve Lillywhite for teaching him his craft, saying they were "people I watched directly and emulated". He named his "heroes" as the Beatles producer George Martin, for "inventing the job", and Trevor Horn, for being "the thing that really made me sit up and listen". He said Joni Mitchell was his favourite artist, citing her "unique combination of musical and lyrical talent".

Godrich said that although he enjoys listening to "clinical" and "shiny" music, he works best creating "organic" sounds: "Making a dark brown soup was more my skill, [rather] than making a big fairy cake." He does not approach acts he produces; instead, he waits for them to contact him, as "I'm not under any illusion that I can improve someone I'm already a fan of".

Godrich said he believes people place too much emphasis on studio equipment and "trickery", which is less important than musical sensibility and communication. He said: "I get very annoyed with people asking me what my favourite microphone is. It doesn't matter ... One of the reasons why music has become generally worse, and I'm sorry to say that, is that people think about technology more than the actual music they're making." He feels that "the recording process is best when fast, because it's then the smallest obstacle to the actual music".

Discography

Composition credits

References

External links
 
 [ Allmusic Credits]
 

1971 births
Living people
21st-century composers
20th-century English musicians
21st-century English musicians
English audio engineers
English male film score composers
English record producers
Grammy Award winners
Musicians from London
People educated at William Ellis School
People from Westminster
Radiohead
Atoms for Peace (band) members